Juba of Mauritania was a writer who lived in Mauretania in the 2nd century.  He wrote a now-lost treatise on metric, based on Heliodorus and used by later grammarians.

2nd-century writers
Year of birth unknown